Empress Liang (梁皇后, personal name unknown) was an empress of the Xiongnu-led Chinese Hu Xia dynasty. Her husband was the founding emperor, Helian Bobo (Emperor Wulie).

Very little is known about Empress Liang.  She was not Helian Bobo's first wife, as prior to his becoming emperor he had married the daughter of the Xianbei chief Mo Yigan (沒奕干).  However, when he rebelled against Later Qin in 407 and established Xia, he made a surprise attack on Mo, who was then a Later Qin general, and killed him, and presumably either before or after that point Lady Mo was either killed or divorced.  In 414, he created Lady Liang, who was by then described as his wife, empress.  No further direct reference to Empress Liang exists in history.  In 427, when Emperor Taiwu of Northern Wei entered the Xia capital Tongwan (統萬, in modern Yulin, Shaanxi) after forcing Helian Bobo's successor Helian Chang to flee, he was mentioned as having captured Helian Bobo's and Helian Chang's empresses, and presumably the person referred to as Helian Bobo's empress was Empress Liang.  The succession table below assumes that she survived her husband.

References

|- style="text-align: center;"

|- style="text-align: center;"

|-

|-

Xia (Sixteen Kingdoms) empresses